Giselle is a female given name of French origin. It is derived from the Germanic word geisil, "pledge". Variants include Ghislain, Ghislaine, Gisela, Gisele, Gisèle, Gizel and Gizele.

Notable people with the name include:

 Giselle of Bavaria (985–1065), Queen of Hungary
 Giselle Ansley (born 1992), British field hockey player
Giselle Bellas, Cuban-American singer-songwriter
 Giselle Blondet (born 1964), Puerto Rican actress and television host
 Giselle Bonilla (born 1994), American actress
Giselle Byrnes, New Zealand historian
 Giselle Corbie-Smith, American physician and health equity researcher
 Giselle Fernández (born 1961), American journalist
 Giselle Itié (born 1982), Brazilian actress
 Giselle Juárez (field hockey) (born 1991), Argentine field hockey player
 Giselle Kañevsky (born 1985), Argentine field hockey player
 Giselle Khoury (born 1961), Lebanese journalist
 Giselle Laronde (born 1963), Trinidadian model and 1986 Miss World
 Giselle Lazzarato (born 1992), Canadian internet personality known professionally as Gigi Gorgeous 
 Giselle Loren (born 1964), American actress
 Giselle Martin-Kniep (born 1956), American educator
 Giselle Patrón (born 1987), Peruvian model
 Giselle Pereira de Vasconcellos (born 1983), Brazilian women's international footballer
 Giselle Rosselli (born 1990), Australian musician
 Giselle Salandy (1987–2009), Trinidadian boxer
 Giselle Soler, Argentinian artistic roller skater
 Giselle Tavera (born 1993), Dominican-American singer
 Giselle Toengi (born 1978), Filipina actress
 Giselle Uchinaga (born 2000), Japanese singer and member of Aespa
 Giselle Zado Wasfie (born 1976), American writer
 Giselle Zarur (born 1987), Mexican sports journalist and television reporter

Fictional characters
 Giselle, in the 2007 Disney film Enchanted
 Giselle, in the Open Season films
 Giselle Villard, in Mystic comics
 Giselle, a 1976 Lancia Scorpion that the titular protagonist falls in love with in Herbie Goes to Monte Carlo
 Gisele Yashar, in The Fast and the Furious franchise
 Giselle, one of the main characters of The House in Fata Morgana
 Giselle, title character in the ballet Giselle
 Giselle Gewelle, a Quincy and a member of the Wandenreich's Sternritter with the designation "Z"—"The Zombie"—in Bleach (manga)

See also
 Giselle (disambiguation)

References

English feminine given names